
Gmina Sulęczyno is a rural gmina (administrative district) in Kartuzy County, Pomeranian Voivodeship, in northern Poland.

Villages
Gmina Sulęczyno contains the villages and settlements of Amalka, Bielawki, Borek, Borek Kamienny, Borowiec, Bukowa Góra, Chojna, Czarlino, Kistówko, Kistowo, Kłodno, Kołodzieje, Mściszewice, Nowy Dwór, Ogonki, Opoka, Ostrów-Mausz, Ostrowite, Podjazy, Sucha, Sulecki Borek, Sulęczyno, Węsiory, Widna Góra, Żakowo, Zdunowice, Zdunowice Małe and Zimna Góra.

Neighbouring gminas
Gmina Sulęczyno is bordered by the gminas of Kościerzyna, Lipusz, Parchowo, Sierakowice and Stężyca.

Suleczyno
Kartuzy County